Dato' Sri Saifuddin bin Abdullah (Jawi: سيف الدين بن عبدالله; born 27 January 1961) is a Malaysian politician who has served as the Member of Parliament (MP) for Indera Mahkota since May 2018. He served as Minister of Foreign Affairs for the second term in the Barisan Nasional (PN) administration under former Prime Minister Ismail Sabri Yaakob from August 2021 to the collapse of the BN administration in November 2022 and the first term in the Pakatan Harapan (PH) administration under former Prime Minister Mahathir Mohamad from July 2018 to the collapse of the PN administration in February 2020, the Minister of Communications and Multimedia in the Perikatan Nasional (PN) administration under former Prime Minister Muhyiddin Yassin from March 2020 to the collapse of the PN administration in August 2021, Deputy Minister of Higher Education II and Deputy Minister of Entrepreneur and Co-operatives Development in the BN administration under former Prime Ministers Abdullah Ahmad Badawi and Najib Razak as well as former Ministers Noh Omar and Mohamed Khaled Nordin from March 2008 to May 2013 and MP for Temerloh from March 2008 to May 2013. He is also a member of the Malaysian United Indigenous Party (BERSATU), a component party of the PN coalition, was member of the People's Justice Party (PKR), a component party of the PH coalition and was member of the United Malays National Organisation (UMNO), a component party of the BN coalition. He is also the State Chairman of BERSATU and PN of Pahang.

Personal life
Saifuddin was born to an ustaz father and a schoolteacher mother in Temerloh near Mentakab, Pahang.

Education
Saifuddin was educated at Sekolah Kebangsaan Abu Bakar Mentakab (1968–73), Malay College Kuala Kangsar - MCKK (1974–80), obtained BA Honors from University of Malaya (1984), Diploma in Translation from Malaysian Translator Association / Dewan Bahasa dan Pustaka (1985) and followed by the Executive Course at Harvard Business School (1995).

Political career
Saifuddin was elected to Parliament in the 2008 election, and was immediately appointed as a deputy minister, being cited as a future ministerial prospect. He had previously been the Secretary-General of the Malaysian Youth Council. After the election he was appointed as a deputy minister, and was the Deputy Minister of Higher Education in Najib Razak's first term as Prime Minister. During his ministerial tenure, Saifuddin was one of the more moderate and liberal-progressive politicians in Najib's administration. He criticised his own government's handling of the Bersih 2.0 rally in 2011, in which over 1,600 protestors were arrested on the streets of Kuala Lumpur. In early 2013, he also stood up for a student who was humiliated by a government-linked panellist at a student forum at the Universiti Utara Malaysia (UUM).

Saifuddin's ministerial career was cut short by the 2013 election, when he lost his parliamentary seat to a Pan-Malaysian Islamic Party (PAS) candidate by 1,070 votes.

Saifuddin has written four books on Malaysian politics. After leaving Parliament he joined the University of Malaya as a research fellow, but in 2014, he resigned his position in protest when Malaysia's Education Ministry forced a well-respected professor at the university to resign, reportedly due to research findings critical of the government.

In 2015, Saifuddin quit UMNO and joined the People's Justice Party (PKR) over disagreements with the government's handling of the 1Malaysia Development Berhad scandal.

In February 2020 political crisis dubbed "Sheraton Move", Saifuddin quit PKR along with deputy president Azmin Ali and 9 other MP's to form an independent parliamentary block.

Health
In April 2021, he was tested positive for COVID-19 and was admitted in the Sungai Buloh Hospital. He was discharged from the hospital after his full recovery 16 days of treatments.

Election results

Honours
  :
  Knight Commander of the Order of the Perak State Crown (DPMP) – Dato' (2002)
  :
  Knight Companion of the Order of Sultan Ahmad Shah of Pahang (DSAP) – Dato' (2009)
  Grand Knight of the Order of Sultan Ahmad Shah of Pahang (SSAP) – Dato' Sri (2021)

External links

References

←

Living people
1961 births
People from Pahang
Malaysian people of Malay descent
Malaysian Muslims
Government ministers of Malaysia
Foreign ministers of Malaysia
Members of the Dewan Rakyat
Former People's Justice Party (Malaysia) politicians
Former United Malays National Organisation politicians
University of Malaya alumni
21st-century Malaysian politicians